Naranjito is a municipality in the Honduran department of Santa Bárbara. It is 920 meters above sea level.

Demographics
At the time of the 2013 Honduras census, Naranjito municipality had a population of 11,901. Of these, 74.51% were Mestizo, 21.99% White, 0.37% Black or Afro-Honduran, 0.25% Indigenous and 2.87% others.

References 

Municipalities of the Santa Bárbara Department, Honduras